Gadge Maharaj (23 February 1876 - 20 December 1956; also known as Sant Gadge Maharaj or Sant Gadge Baba) was an Indian mendicant-saint and social reformer from the Indian state of Maharashtra. He lived in voluntary poverty and wandered to different villages promoting social justice and initiating reforms, especially related to sanitation. He is still revered by the common people in India and remains a source of inspiration for various political parties and non-government organizations.

Life and career 

His original name was Debuji Zhingraji Janorkar. He was born in Shendgaon village in present-day Anjangaon Surji Taluka in Amravati District of Maharashtra to a Dhobi family.
A public teacher, he travelled from one place to another wearing his food pan upturned on his head and carrying his trademark broom. When he entered a village, he would instantly start cleaning the gutters and roads of the village. He also told the citizens of the village that their congratulations would have to wait until his work was done. Villagers gave him money, babaji used that for progress of physical as well as thinking of society. From the obtained money, Maharaj built educational institutions, dharmashalas, hospitals and animal shelters.

He conducted his discourses in the form of "Kirtans"  in which he would emphasize values like service to humanity and compassion. During his Kirtans, he would educate people against blind faiths and rituals. He would use Dohas (couplets of a song) by Saint Kabir in his discourses.

He exhorted people to stop animal sacrifice as part of religious rituals and campaigned against vices such as alcohol abuse.

He tried to embody the values that he preached: hard work, simple living and selfless service to the poor. He abandoned his family (a wife and three children) to pursue this path.

Maharaj met the spiritual teacher Meher Baba several times. Meher Baba indicated that Maharaj was one of his favourite saints and that Maharaj was on the sixth plane of consciousness. Maharaj invited Meher Baba to Pandharpur, India, and on 6 November 1954 thousands of people had Maharaj and Meher Baba's darshan.

Relation with Ambedkar

Gadge Baba  highly influenced Dr. Babasaheb Ambedkar. The reason for this was that the social reform work he was doing by preaching to the people through his "kirtan", Dr. Ambedkar was doing the same through politics. Gadge Baba was also impressed by Babasaheb's personality and work. Gaadge Baba had donated the building of his hostel at Pandharpur to the People’s Education Society founded by Dr Ambedkar. He used to cite the example of Ambedkar while urging the people to get educated. "Look, how Dr. Babasaheb Ambedkar became such a learned man by dint of sheer hard work. Education is not the monopoly of any class or caste. The son of a poor man can also obtain many degrees." Gadge Baba had met Ambedkar many times. Ambedkar used to meet him frequently and discuss social reform. Dr. Babasaheb Ambedkar had described him as the greatest servant of the people after Jyotirao Phule.

Death and legacy

Maharaj died on 20 December 1956 on his way to Amravati, on the banks of river Pedhi near Walgaon. The Government of Maharashtra started the Sant Gadge baba Gram Swachata Abhiyan project in 2000-01 in his honour. This programme awards prizes to villagers, who maintain clean villages. In addition, the Government of India instituted a National Award for Sanitation and Water in his honour.
The University of Amravati has also been named in his honour.

Honors

The postal department of India had honored Gadge Maharaj by issuing a commemorative stamp in his name.

Notes

External links

References
12. Prabodhan Pandharicha Krantirak Sant Gadgebaba - Santosh Arsod.

https://manovikasprakashan.com/index.php?route=product/product&product_id=1052

1956 deaths
20th-century Hindu religious leaders
Marathi people
1876 births
Indian social reformers
Activists from Maharashtra
People from Amravati district
Marathi Hindu saints